Mgr Gabriel Wilhemus Manek (Lay Tjong Sie) SVD (Ailomea Lahurus 1913 – St Joseph Hospital, Denver, CO 30 November 1989) was an Indonesian Archbishop of The Roman Catholic Church

Biography

Gabriel Wilhemus Manek was born on August 18, 1913 in Ailomea, Lahurus, Timor island. He was the youngest son of the couple John Leki (Lay Phiang Sioe) and Lioe Kioe Moy. Baptized one day after his birth which is on August 19, 1913 under the name: Gabriel John
Wilhelmus Manek by Pastor Arnold Verstraelen. SVD.

When his father was in China, and not long after his mother who was of mixed Chinese blood died.

He was then adopted as a foster child by Maria Belak, wife of King Don Kaitanus da costa, King of the kingdom of Tasifeto, North Belu. In 1920, he entered primary school in Halilulik
school standards in Ndona, then entered the Seminary at Sikka in 1927. On 16 October 1932 he entered the Novitiate SVD and since 17 January 1937 lecture at the seminary high Ledalero, and graduated force. He was ordained a priest by Mgr Hendrikus Leven. In March, exactly at the time he was 38 years old, Pope Pius XII appointed him bishop on 25 April 1951.

Sources 
 NGALAP BERKAH DI MAKAM MONSINYUR MANEK (indonesian)
 Sejarah Pendiri PRR (indonesian)
 Gabriel Manek SVD (indonesian)

20th-century Roman Catholic archbishops in Indonesia
Indonesian people of Chinese descent
Divine Word Missionaries Order
1913 births
1989 deaths